WWPA (1340 AM) is a talk radio station broadcasting at 1340 AM and licensed to serve the community of Williamsport, Pennsylvania, United States.

History
On May 1, 2017, WWPA changed its format from adult standards to a sports format affiliated with ESPN Radio. In late 2021, WWPA dropped its ESPN sports format and flipped to an all-talk format as part of the Twin Valley's Talk Network.

External links

WPA
Radio stations established in 1949
1949 establishments in Pennsylvania